Kanana is a community council located in the Berea District of Lesotho. Its population in 2006 was 19,311.

Education
Ha Fusi Primary School is a church school, run by the Anglican Church of Lesotho.  After teaching at the primary school in 2003, Andrew Uglow set about raising funds so that the church could open a secondary school.  With land donated by the village chief, a three classroom school was built.  Ha Fusi Secondary School was registered by the government of Lesotho in 2009.

Villages
The community of Kanana includes the villages

Berea MissionHa 'NepeHa AlanvenHa Bolisi (Qalakheng)Ha BuasonoHa FakoHa FusiHa JubileHa LehlohonoloHa LelumaHa LenkathebeHa LepamoHa MabekenyaneHa MakebeHa MakoanyaneHa Makoatlane (Lekokoaneng)Ha MakolaHa MalofosaHa MaopeHa Mapokotsa

Ha MarapoHa MohoangHa MoketetsaHa MokheleHa Mokhenene (Lekokoaneng)Ha MokhoeleHa Mokhohlane (Lekokoaneng)Ha Moloko (Lekokoaneng)Ha MotsikoaneHa MotšoeneHa MpikoHa NtajaHa RakoloiHa Ralinakanyane (Lekokoaneng)Ha Ralisieng (Lekokoaneng)Ha RamoseekaHa SakoaneHa SebolaiHa ShadrackHa Sole

Ha SouruHa TauLetsatseng (Ha Majara)LibopingLinokong (Lekokoaneng)LiphiringLithakongLitšiling (Lekokoaneng)Lovely Rock (Ha Majara)MafotholengMalumengMaqhakaMatšengMatsitsingSekhutloanengSenyotongShano-Leholo (Lekokoaneng)Thabana-TšooanaTsereoane (Sekolong)Tsoili-Tsoili

Water project
Construction of a water project due to start at Ha Makebe in Berea, will be coupled with the construction of 30,000 ventilated improved pit latrines for 250 villages countrywide. The project is intended to improve the supply of water for households, industries, business premises and the agricultural sector.  Funding for the project is provided by the Millennium Challenge Account.

Cultural references

Local poet Moleko Sebuwasngwe is critical of Kanana in his poem “God of Kanana is unhappy”.

References

External links
 Google map of community villages

Populated places in Berea District